Mount John Oliver is a  mountain in the Premier Range of the Cariboo Mountains in the east-central interior of British Columbia, Canada.  The mountain is located on the divide between the Kiwa and Tete Creeks and is covered by a glacier.

The name honours John Oliver, the Premier of British Columbia from 1921 to 1927.  The mountain was named after Oliver in 1927 upon the dedication of the Premier Range as a memorial to British and Canadian heads of government. It is the only mountain in the Premier Range to be named after a provincial premier.

References

External links
British Columbia Government Information Sheet for the Premier Range

Three-thousanders of British Columbia
Cariboo Mountains
Cariboo Land District